Pedro Alberto Guiberguis (born July 26, 1969 in Libertador General San Martín, Jujuy) is a former Argentine football midfielder who played at professional level in Argentina, Bolivia and Ecuador.

Club career
Guiberguis began his career in second division with Gimnasia y Tiro de Salta. While playing for Gimnasia, the team was promoted to first division in two occasions, the first in the 1993-94 season and later in the 1997-98 campaign. After a decade in Salta with 250 in all competitions, Guiberguis transferred to first division club Gimnasia y Esgrima de Jujuy where he played during 1999. The following year he moved to Ecuador, but after only one game with Barcelona from Guayaquil he left the club. From there he relocated to Bolivia, where he joined Wilstermann. With the aviadores he won the national title in 2000, and played in Copa Libertadores the next year.

In 2002 Bolívar acquired his rights. He was fundamental in the team structure as he helped the club collect two more titles in its rich history. During his spell with Bolívar, the team also reached the Copa Sudamericana 2004 finals, but lost to Argentine club Boca Juniors. In July 2005, Guiberguis announced his retirement from the professional activity. Shortly after he return to Argentina, and played a few more games for fourth division club Atlético Ledesma.

Club titles

External links
 Argentine Primera statistics  
 BDFA profile 

1969 births
Living people
Sportspeople from Jujuy Province
Argentine footballers
Association football midfielders
Gimnasia y Esgrima de Jujuy footballers
Barcelona S.C. footballers
Expatriate footballers in Ecuador
C.D. Jorge Wilstermann players
Club Bolívar players
Expatriate footballers in Bolivia
Argentine expatriate footballers
Argentine expatriate sportspeople in Bolivia